The 2004 U-18 Junior World Cup was an under-18 ice hockey tournament held in Břeclav and Hodonín, Czech Republic and Piešťany, Slovakia from August 10–15, 2004.  Canada captured their tenth gold medal of the tournament, defeating the Czech Republic 4–1 in the gold medal game, while Sweden defeated the United States to earn the bronze medal.

Final round

Gold medal game

Final standings

See also
2004 IIHF World U18 Championships
2008 World Junior Championships

References
2004 U-18 Junior World Cup Schedule/Results on HockeyCanada.ca (Archived 2009-07-22)

U-18 Junior World Cup, 2004
2004
International ice hockey competitions hosted by Slovakia
International ice hockey competitions hosted by the Czech Republic
Ivan
2004–05 in Slovak ice hockey